Boy, Did I Get a Wrong Number! is a 1966 DeLuxe Color American comedy film starring Bob Hope and Elke Sommer. This film marked the first of three film collaborations for Hope and comedian Phyllis Diller, and was followed by Eight on the Lam in 1967 and The Private Navy of Sgt. O'Farrell in 1968.

Plot 
A gorgeous French actress named Didi (Elke Sommer) has become more famous for commercials involving bubble baths than for acting. Fed up with the situation, she winds up running away for a while to Oregon, where she encounters a middle-aged married realtor (Bob Hope) who agrees to secretly assist her and thereby becomes enmeshed in various complications when the realtor and his wacky housekeeper try to hide her from being found by his wife and by the public.

Cast
 Bob Hope as Tom Meade
 Elke Sommer as Didi
 Phyllis Diller as Lily
 Cesare Danova as Pepe Pepponi
 Marjorie Lord as Mrs. Martha Meade
 Kelly Thordsen as Detective Shawn Regan
 Benny Baker as Detective Lt. Schwartz
 Terry Burnham as Doris Meade
 Joyce Jameson as Telephone operator
 Harry von Zell as Newscaster / Off-Screen Narrator
 Kevin Burchett as Larry Meade
 Keith Taylor as Plympton

Production
The film was Bob Hope's second with Edward Small. Filming started in October 1965. It marked Phyllis Diller's film debut as a lead – she signed for five more pictures with Hope.

Reception 
With Bob Hope's film career on the downswing by the '60s, Boy, Did I Get a Wrong Number! was critically panned and compared to a "90-minute TV sitcom". The critic for The New York Times drew parallels with Up in Mabel's Room which Edward Small had made twenty years previously. Reviews were poor. However it performed well at the box office. Boy, Did I Get a Wrong Number! was listed in the 1978 book The Fifty Worst Films of All Time.

See also
 List of American films of 1966

References

External links 
 
 
 
 

1966 films
1966 comedy films
1960s English-language films
American comedy films
Films about actors
Films directed by George Marshall
Films produced by Edward Small
Films scored by Richard LaSalle
Films set in Oregon
United Artists films
1960s American films